Detectives in Trouble (lit. Crime Squad) is a 2011 South Korean police procedural television series starring Song Il-kook, Lee Jong-hyuk, Song Ji-hyo, Park Sun-young, Jang Hang-sun, Sung Ji-ru and Kim Joon. It aired on KBS2 from March 7 to April 26, 2011 on Mondays and Tuesdays at 21:55 for 16 episodes.

Plot
Based on real-life cases, this Korean drama focuses on a group of detectives in the Seoul Gangnam Police Homicide Division who solve crimes with their variety of skills and investigative methods. At the forefront of the team is the hotheaded detective Park Se-hyuk and the cold, commanding police chief, Jung Il-do. Se-hyuk's impulsive, act-first-think-later methods, instincts honed on the streets, and pesky habit of threatening resignation clashes with his superior Il-do's strict, by-the-book style. The two also share a painful past, with Il-do being the detective on the case involving the death of Se-hyuk's daughter. Along with tenacious reporter Jo Min-joo and the rest of the homicide squad, they must now overcome their differences to solve crimes together.

Cast

Main cast
Song Il-kook as Park Se-hyuk 
A hot headed detective with an act first think later behavior. He's the father of hae in and joins the police force to help find the truth for his daughter's death. He has a bad relation with his superior Jung Il do as he believes that Jung Il do caused his daughter's death. 
Lee Jong-hyuk as Jung Il-do
Team leader of homicide department team 2, later the director. 
Song Ji-hyo as Jo Min-joo
A hot blooded reporter working for shocking.com. She works with Park Se-hyuk and gets exclusive news from the homicide department cases and at the same time aids them in their investigation. She has a crush on Park Se-hyuk.
Park Sun-young as Heo Eun-young
Mother of hae in. Divorced wife of park se hyuk. 
Sunwoo Sun as Jin Mi-sook
A police who dreams of joining the homicide department. Before joining the department she works as a patrol police and has a nickname "cold feet " as she will freeze in front of criminals and thus lose them. She dies in ep 7-8 to save a high school girl from a fire accident. 
Jang Hang-sun as Team leader Kwon Young-sool
Retired team leader of homicide department team 2.
Kim Joon as Shin Dong-jin
Computer genius in homicide department team 2.
Sung Ji-ru as Nam Tae-shik
Detective in homicide department team 2. Trust park se hyuk wholeheartedly. Neighbor of yu mi and Jo min ju. 
Kim Sun-kyung as Im Eun-kyung
Team leader of homicide department team 2.
Kim Jong-kook as Shua In Pang

Supporting cast
Choo So-young as Yoon Sung-hee 
Park Joon-hyuk as Kang Sung-chul
Joo Ho as Choi Tae-soo
Choi Min as Byun Sang-tae
Jang Nam-yeol as Ma Jong-pil
Evan as Alex Lee 
Lee Yeong-hoon as Kim Young-tae
Park Jung-woo as Kim Chul-min
Kim Young-hoon as Ji Young-ho
Lee El as Yoo Hye-min
Kim Kyu-chul as Jo Sang-tae
Oh Yong as Reporter Nam
Lee Yeon-joo as Seol-hee
Oh Ji-yeon as Oh Eun-joo
Song Shi-yeon as Park Eun-ah
Baek Seung-hee as Shin Yoo-mi
Kim Yoo-bin as Park Hae-in, Se-hyuk's daughter

Guests 
 Jo Jae-yoon as Yang Do-soo (ep. 1)
Hwang Kwang-hee as Hyun-soo (ep. 1)
Lee Min-woo as Lee Dong-suk (ep. 1-3)
Kim Yoon-hye as Lee So-min (ep. 7-8)
Won Jong-rye as Il-do's mother  (ep. 13)

Production
Kim Seung-woo was originally cast in the role of Jung Il-do, but dropped out for personal reasons a month before the show's premiere and was replaced by Lee Jong-hyuk.

Sunwoo Sun left the drama after episode 7, reportedly due to her dissatisfaction with how her character was written. She was written out, and replaced on the "squad" by Kim Sun-kyung.

Notes

References

External links
  
 
 

Korean Broadcasting System television dramas
2011 South Korean television series debuts
2011 South Korean television series endings
Korean-language television shows
Detective television series
South Korean crime television series